Encomium: A Tribute to Led Zeppelin is a tribute album by various artists dedicated to Led Zeppelin, released by Atlantic Records on March 14, 1995. Many of the appearing artists were signed to Atlantic or an affiliate at the time of the release.

Track listing

Release history
The Maná track "Fool in the Rain" did not appear on the first release of this album and was added in later editions.

There is also a laserdisc version of this release, containing all 13 tracks (including Maná) and interviews and behind the scenes footage.

Catalogue: Atlantic 82731-2

References

Led Zeppelin tribute albums
1995 compilation albums
Atlantic Records compilation albums
Hard rock compilation albums